William Henry Heald (August 27, 1864 – June 3, 1939) was an American banker, lawyer and politician, from Wilmington, in New Castle County, Delaware. He was a member of the Republican Party, who served two terms as U. S. Representative from Delaware.

Early life and family
Heald was born in Wilmington, Delaware. He graduated from the University of Delaware in 1883 and from the law department of George Washington University in Washington, D.C. in 1888.

Professional and political career
Heald was a national bank examiner in Montana, Idaho, Washington, and Oregon from 1888 until 1892, when he was admitted to the bar in Wilmington in 1897. He was appointed Postmaster for Wilmington from 1901 until 1905.

Heald was elected to the U.S. House of Representatives in 1908 and won election again in 1910. During these terms, he served in the Republican majority in the 61st Congress and in the minority in the 62nd Congress. He did not seek reelection in 1912 and served two terms, from March 4, 1909, until March 3, 1913. This was during the administration of U.S. President William H. Taft.

Subsequently, he resumed the practice of law and was engaged in banking. He was a member of the Board of Trustees of the University of Delaware from 1915 until 1939 and was president of that board from 1936 until his death.

Death and legacy
Heald died at Wilmington and is buried there in the Wilmington and Brandywine Cemetery.

Almanac
Elections are held the first Tuesday after November 1. U.S. Representatives took office March 4 and have a two-year term.

References

External links
Biographical Directory of the United States Congress
Delaware's Members of Congress
The Political Graveyard
Delaware Historical Society; website; 505 North Market Street, Wilmington, Delaware 19801; (302) 655-7161
University of Delaware; Library website; 181 South College Avenue, Newark, Delaware 19717; (302) 831-2965
Newark Free Library; 750 Library Ave., Newark, Delaware; (302) 731-7550

1864 births
1939 deaths
Burials at Wilmington and Brandywine Cemetery
People from Wilmington, Delaware
Delaware lawyers
University of Delaware alumni
George Washington University Law School alumni
Republican Party members of the United States House of Representatives from Delaware